The Cat and Fiddle Inn is the second-highest public house in England, the Tan Hill Inn being the highest. In 2020, the outlet was sold to a distiller, who intend to open Britain's highest-altitude whisky distillery.

It is in the Peak District National Park, on the A537 just west of the Derbyshire/Cheshire county boundary, on the western side of Axe Edge Moor, 1,689 feet (515 m) above sea level.

History and closure

The pub was built in 1813. It closed in 2015, and its future as a public house was uncertain.

The inn was the last on the  Four Inns Walk fell race/hiking event, which was held annually in spring, mainly over the high moorland to the north. As of 2023, the event is now known as The Kinder Elite.

Re-opening in 2020
In 2019, a long-term lease was taken out on the building by Forest Distillery, who intended to re-open the site in summer 2020 as a destination attraction featuring a distillery, shop and pub. Crowd funding provided over £50,000 of a estimated £250,000 for the restoration.

In the summer of 2020, during the COVID-19 pandemic, the Distillery opened a take-out bottle shop in a section of the building, selling high-end spirits, wines, beers and coffee. Refurbishment was ongoing, with plans for pre-booked tours later in the month and the charging of the stills to produce single malt English whisky.

Cat and Fiddle Road
The inn gives its name to the Cat and Fiddle Road, a stretch of the A537 road linking Macclesfield to the west with Buxton to the east, which features many sharp corners. This road became notorious for the high number of accidents, particularly among motorcyclists for whom the road is often regarded as an exhilarating technical challenge; an AA survey in 2003 named it as the most dangerous stretch of road in the United Kingdom.

A 2016 report indicated that between 2007 and 2011, there were 44 serious or fatal crashes on the  stretch. Between 2002 and 2006, there were 35. The report stated that the safety issue is caused by "severe bends, steep falls from the carriageway and edged by dry-stone walls for almost the entirety of the road". Derby and Derbyshire Road Safety Partnership and the Department for Transport arranged for the installation of front- and rear-facing speed cameras in the area. These were confirmed to be in place in December 2019.

Other pubs
There are several pubs of this name in the United Kingdom. For example, there is a Cat and Fiddle pub in Hinton, Hampshire, currently owned by Harvester.

Various etymologies are claimed: some believe it is a corruption of le chat fidèle ('the faithful cat'); others (including Brewer's Dictionary of Phrase and Fable) that it comes from Caton le Fidèle (a former governor of Calais); a third theory is that it derives from Catherine la Fidèle (Catherine of Aragon).

References

External links

Pubs in Cheshire
Peak District